A Better Mantrap is a collection of science fiction short stories by British writer Bob Shaw, published in 1982. The book is Shaw's eighteenth overall and his third collection of short stories. Critic David Langford described the book as "good and entertaining", but lightweight in comparison to Shaw's novels.

Content 
It includes:

 "Conversion"
 "Crossing the Line"
 "Small World"
 "The Kingdom of O'Ryan"
 "Dream Fighter"
 "The Cottage of Eternity"
 "In the Hereafter Hilton"
 "Amphitheatre"
 "Frost Animals"

References 

1982 short story collections
Short story collections by Bob Shaw
Victor Gollancz Ltd books